Ayatallah el Khoumini Hamoud (born 10 August 1990) is an Algerian handball player for ES Ain Touta.

He competed for the Algerian national team at the 2015 World Men's Handball Championship in Qatar.

He also participated at the 2011 and 2013 World Championships.

References

1990 births
Living people
Algerian male handball players
Competitors at the 2018 Mediterranean Games
People from Aïn Touta
Mediterranean Games competitors for Algeria
21st-century Algerian people